George Joseph Cvek (April 16, 1917 – February 26, 1942) was an American murderer and serial rapist. He was executed for killing 29-year-old Catherine "Kitty" Pappas, the wife of a coffee importer, in the Bronx, New York City on February 5, 1941. 

Cvek was born in 1918 in Harrisburg, Pennsylvania and raised in nearby Steelton, Pennsylvania, descended from Yugoslav and Hungarian heritage. By his own admission, his upbringing was rough, as his family was abusive.

Bronx detectives, working with an unprecedented number of city, state and federal authorities from Maine to New Orleans, Louisiana, as well as the surviving victims of Cvek's sexual assaults, traced at least 81 robberies and rapes during a nine-month span from mid-1940 to February 1941 to Cvek's unique modus operandi of asking for a glass of water and aspirin that earned him the moniker "The Aspirin Bandit," and "The Gentleman Killer" following the Pappas murder. After his arrest on the Pappas murder charge, Cvek admitted to the rapes of 14 other women in the New York City area.

The jury found Cvek guilty of murdering Pappas on May 19, 1941, and only took twenty minutes of deliberation to sentence him to death.
He was executed on February 26, 1942, in the electric chair at Sing Sing Prison in New York. His burial location remains unknown.

He was the subject of a 2017 episode of the Investigation Discovery series A Crime to Remember.

Notes

Sources

1910s births
1942 deaths
1941 murders in the United States
American rapists
American people executed for murder
Executed people from New York (state)
People executed by New York (state) by electric chair
20th-century executions by New York (state)
American people of Hungarian descent
American people of Yugoslav descent